The 2012–13 Purdue Boilermakers men's basketball team represented Purdue University in the 2012–13 NCAA Division I men's basketball season . The head coach was Matt Painter, in his eighth season with the Boilers. The team played its home games in Mackey Arena in West Lafayette, Indiana and was a member of the Big Ten Conference. They finished the season 16–18, 8–10 in Big Ten play to finish in a three-way tie for seventh place. After a first round loss in the Big Ten tournament, the school received a bid to in the College Basketball Invitational where they lost to Santa Clara in the quarterfinals. The season marked the first time in six years that Purdue had not won at least one NCAA tournament game.

Previous season 
The Boilermakers finished the 2011–12 season 22–13, 20–8 in Big Ten play to finish in sixth place. They lost in the quarterfinals of the Big Ten tournament. They received an at-large bid to the NCAA tournament as a No. 10 seed. There they defeated Saint Mary's in the Second Round (formerly and now known as the First Round) before losing to No. 6 Kansas.

Season Notes 
Purdue was one of four regional hosts for the 2K Sports Classic Tournament in November 2012.  The championship doubleheaders for the tournament were hosted at Madison Square Garden in New York City on November 15–16.
Purdue was slated to participate in a summer tour of Italy in August 2012.  Due to NCAA rule changes, it was the first year incoming freshmen were allowed to participate in such tours.  Additionally, the Boilermakers will be allowed 10 practices in advance of the trip.
Purdue finished 7th in B1G play with an 8-10 record. 
Purdue lost its first home opener during the Matt Painter era to Bucknell.
Freshman guard Rapheal Davis scored 21 points in 10 minutes against #22 ranked Notre Dame at Conseco Fieldhouse. 
Freshman center A. J. Hammons scored 30 points in Purdue's 97-60 loss to Indiana, their worst home loss in the storied rivalry. 
Junior guard Terone Johnson scored 32 points against #7 ranked Michigan, the most points scored by any player in B1G play on the season.
Senior DJ Byrd led the B1G in three point field goals made, averaging 2.6 made per game.
DJ Byrd surpassed Chad Austin and E'Twaun Moore with the tenth-most three point field goals in a single season. 
A. J. Hammons led the B1G in blocks per game, averaging 2 per contest. 
Freshmen made up for nearly half (46%) of Purdue's scoring on the season.
Terone Johnson led Purdue with 13.3 points per game on the season. 
A. J. Hammons led Purdue and all B1G freshmen with 6.1 rebounds per game on the season.
Ronnie Johnson led Purdue with 4 assists per game on the season. 
A. J. Hammons was the only player in the power six conferences averaging at least 10 points, 6 rebounds, and 2 blocks per contest on the season. 
On the season, Purdue was second in rebounding in the B1G, averaging 39.3 per contest, boasting a +5.3 margin. 
Freshman point guard Ronnie Johnson averaged 4.6 assists per game in B1G action, trailing only Michigan's All-American, Trey Burke. 
3 of Purdue's 6 losses in preseason play came against eventual NCAA Tournament teams (Bucknell, Villanova, Notre Dame).
Purdue defeated two top-twenty teams on the season after beating #11 Illinois at home and #17 Wisconsin on the road in conference play. Purdue defeated just one ranked opponent the prior season. 
Senior DJ Byrd was a B1G Honorable Mention for the second year in a row. 
Junior Terone Johnson was a Third Team All-B1G selection with the coaches' pick, as well as a B1G Honorable Mention by the media.  
Freshman A. J. Hammons was a Freshman All-B1G selection, Purdue's first since Kelsey Barlow in 2010.
In the regular season finale, head coach Matt Painter received his 200th career win as a head coach after defeating Minnesota.
Throughout the season, Painter regularly started at least three freshman at a time with three eventually being consistent starters (center AJ Hammons, point guard Ronnie Johnson, and shooting guard Rapheal Davis).
Ronnie Johnson scored a career high 27 points against Santa Clara in the last game of the season during the CBI tournament

Roster

Incoming recruits

Schedule 

|-
!colspan=9 style=| Exhibition
|-

|-
!colspan=9 style=| Non-conference regular season
|-

|-
!colspan=9 style=| Big Ten regular season

|-
!colspan=9 style=| Big Ten tournament

|-
!colspan=9 style=| CBI

2013 Signing Class

References 

Purdue
Purdue Boilermakers men's basketball seasons
Purdue
Purdue Boilermakers men's basketball
Purdue Boilermakers men's basketball